Akkajaure (from ) is one of the largest reservoirs in Sweden. It lies at the headwaters of the Lule River in Norrbotten County, in Swedish Lappland, within the Stora Sjöfallet national park. The lake formed after the construction of the first Suorva dam in 1913–1923. On 8 January 2016, West Air Sweden Flight 294 crashed near Akkajaure, killing both crew members on board.

References

Lakes of Norrbotten County
Lule River basin